Lily Allen is an English singer, songwriter and actress. Her music career incorporates elements of electropop, R&B, and reggae. Her first album Alright, Still was released in 2006, earning a triple platinum certification in the United Kingdom and a gold certification in the United States. Allen's 2009 album It's Not Me, It's You was certified triple platinum in the United Kingdom. Her third album Sheezus was released in 2014, receiving a gold certification in the United Kingdom, and fourth album No Shame was released in 2018.

Allen has received 31 awards and 73 nominations for her music, including nominations for nine BRIT Awards (one won), one Grammy Award, three Ivor Novello Awards (three won), one Mercury Prize and twelve NME Awards (three won). She has also been nominated for one Laurence Olivier Award for her work in theatre.

Major associations

BRIT Awards
The Brit Awards are the British Phonographic Industry's annual pop music awards. Allen has received one award from nine nominations.

|-
|rowspan="4"|2007
|rowspan="2"|Lily Allen
|British Breakthrough Act
|
|-
|British Female Solo Artist
|
|-
|Alright, Still
|British Album of the Year
|
|-
|"Smile"
|British Single of the Year
|
|-
|rowspan="3"|2010
|Lily Allen
|British Female Solo Artist
|
|-
|It's Not Me, It's You
|British Album of the Year
|
|-
|"The Fear"
|British Single of the Year
|
|-
|2015
|Lily Allen
|British Female Solo Artist
|
|-
|2019
|Lily Allen
|British Female Solo Artist
|

Grammy Awards
The Grammy Awards are awarded annually by the National Academy of Recording Arts and Sciences of the United States. Allen has been nominated one time.

|-
| align="center"|2008
|Alright, Still
|Best Alternative Music Album
|
|-

Laurence Olivier Awards
The Laurence Olivier Award is an annual award presented by the Society of London Theatre in recognition of achievements in commercial British theatre. Allen has been nominated for one award from one category.

|-
| align="center"|2022
| 2:22 A Ghost Story
| Best Actress
| 
|-
|}

Music awards

BMI Awards
Broadcast Music, Inc. (BMI) is one of three United States performing rights organizations, along with ASCAP and SESAC. It collects license fees on behalf of songwriters, composers, and music publishers and distributes them as royalties to those members whose works have been performed. Lily Allen has received four awards for songwriting.

|-
| align="center"|2008
|"Smile"
|rowspan=4|BMI Pop Song
|
|-
| align="center"|2010
|"The Fear"
|
|-
| 2012
| "5 O'Clock" (with T-Pain & Wiz Khalifa)
| 
|-
| 2015
| "True Love" (with Pink)
|

BT Digital Music Awards
The BT Digital Music Awards are held annually in the United Kingdom. Lily Allen has received one award from one nomination.

|-
| align="2"|2006
| Lily Allen
| Best Pop Artist
| 
|-

Billboard Music Awards

!Ref.
|-
| 2009
| "The Fear"
| Top Hot Dance Club Play Track
| 
|

Billboard.com Mid-Year Music Awards

|-
| 2014
| Lily Allen 
| Best Comeback 
|

Classic Pop Reader Awards
Classic Pop is a monthly British music magazine, which launched in October 2012.

|-
| rowspan=4|2019
| Herself
| Artist of the Year
| 
|-
| No Shame
| Album of the Year
| 
|-
| "Lost My Mind"
| Single of the Year
| 
|-
| My Thoughts Exactly
| Book of the Year
|

Digital Spy Reader Awards
In 2008, the Digital Spy held its first Digital Spy Soap Awards. The nominations shortlist was chosen by Digital Spy's soaps editor Kris Green. From 2014, the awards became the annual Digital Spy Reader Awards, which polls the site's readers for the best moments in various categories.

|-
| 2018
| Lily Allen
| Best Singer
|

Download Music Awards

|-
| rowspan="4" align="center"|2009
|It's Not Me, It's You
|Best Album
|
|-
| rowspan="2"|"Not Fair"
|Best Single
|
|-
|Best Music Video
|
|-
|Lily Allen
|Best Female Act
|
|-

European Festival Awards

|-
|align="center"|2009
|Fuck You
|Anthem of the Year
|
|-

ELLE Style Awards

|-
| align="center"|2014
| Lily Allen
| UK Recording Artist Female 
| 
|-

Fonogram Awards

|-
| align="center"|2010
| It's Not Me, It's You
| Fonogram Award for Best International Modern Pop/Rock Album
| 
|-

GAFFA Awards

GAFFA Awards (Denmark)
Delivered since 1991, the GAFFA Awards are a Danish award that rewards popular music by the magazine of the same name.

!
|-
| 2006
| Herself
| Best Foreign Female Act
| 
| style="text-align:center;" |
|-
|}

GAFFA Awards (Sweden)
Delivered since 2010, the GAFFA Awards (Swedish: GAFFA Priset) are a Swedish award that rewards popular music, awarded by the GAFFA magazine.

|-
| 2019
| Lily Allen
| Best International Solo Artist
|

Glamour Woman of the Year Awards
Lily Allen has received two awards from two nominations.

|-
| rowspan="1" align="center"|2008
| rowspan="2"|Lily Allen
| Editor's Special Award
| 
|-
| align="center"|2010
| Best UK Solo Artist
| 
|-

Gold Digital Single Awards

|-
| align="center"|2009
| Best Track
| The Fear
|

Global Mobile Awards

|-
| align="center"|2007
| Lily Allen
| The Artist Campaign Award
| 
|-

IFPI Platinum Europe Awards
The Platinum Europe Awards, established in 1996 by the International Federation of the Phonographic Industry (IFPI), recognize artists that have achieved sales of one million copies of an album in Europe.[18] Lily Allen has received two Platinum Award.

|-
| align="center"|2007
| rowspan="2"|Lily Allen
| Album Title Q1 Alright Still
|
|-
| align="center"|2009
| Album Title Q4 Its Not Me Its You
| 
|-

Imagina Awards

|-
| align="center"|2010
| Lily Allen
| Best Video Clip – Fuck You
| 
|-

Ivor Novello Awards
The Ivor Novello Awards, named after the Cardiff born entertainer Ivor Novello, are awards for songwriting and composing. They are presented annually in London by the British Academy of Songwriters, Composers and Authors (BASCA) and were first introduced in 1955. Lily Allen won three awards for two of her singles and her songwriting.

|-
| rowspan="3" align="center"|2010
| Lily Allen
| Songwriters of the Year with Greg Kurstin
| 
|-
| rowspan="2"|"The Fear"
| Best Song Musically and Lyrically with Greg Kurstin
| 
|-
| PRS for Music Most Performed Work
| 
|-

Los Premios MTV Latinoamérica
Los Premios MTV Latinoamérica is the Latin American version of the MTV Video Music Awards. They were established in 2002 to celebrate the top music videos of the year in Latin America and the world. Lil Allen has been nominated once time.

|-
| align="center"|2007
| Lily Allen
| Best International New Artist
| 
|-

Mercury Prize
The Mercury Prize is awarded annually to the best British or Irish album of the year. The twelve shortlisted acts receive an "Award of the Year" trophy, and the winner receives an additional trophy. The award was established by the British Phonographic Industry and British Association of Record Dealers. Allen was nominated in 2018.

|-
| align="center"|2018
|No Shame
| Mercury Prize
| 
|-

Meteor Ireland Music Awards
The Meteor Music Awards are the national music awards of Ireland, held every year since 2001 and promoted by MCD Productions. Lily Allen has received one award from two nominations

|-
| align="center"|2007
| rowspan="2"|Lily Allen
| rowspan="2"|Best International Female
| 
|-
| align="center"|2010
| 
|-

MP3 Music Awards

|-
| align="center"|2009
| "The Fear"
| Indie/Rock/Pop Award
| 
|-
| align="center"|2010
| "Just Be Good to Green"
| The RCD Award (Radio / Charts / Downloads)
| 
|-

MTV Awards

MTV Australia Video Music Awards
The MTV Australia Awards is an annual awards ceremony established in 2005 by MTV Australia. Lily Allen has been nominated once.

|-
| align="center"|2007
| "Smile"
| Spankin' New Artist
| 
|-

MTV Europe Music Awards
The MTV Europe Music Awards (EMA) were established in 1994 by MTV Networks Europe to celebrate the most popular music videos in Europe. Lily Allen received two nominations.

|-
| align="center"|2006
| rowspan="2"|Lily Allen
| Best UK & Ireland Act
| 
|-
| align="center"|2007
| Artist Choice
| 
|-

MTV Video Music Awards
The MTV Video Music Awards were established in 1984 by MTV to celebrate the top music videos of the year. Allen has been nominated one time.

|-
| align="center"|2007
| Lily Allen
| Best New Artist
| 
|-

MTV Video Music Awards Japan
The MTV Video Music Awards Japan are the Japanese version of the MTV Video Music Awards. Initially Japan was part of the MTV Asia Awards, which were part all Asian countries, but because of the musical variety existent in Japan, a factor that neighboring countries have not, and in May 2002 began to hold their own awards independently. Lily Allen has received three nominations.

|-
| rowspan="2" align="center"|2007
|rowspan="2"|"Smile"
|Best New Artist Video
|
|-
|Best Reggae Video
|
|-
| align="center"|2009
|"The Fear"
|Best Pop Video
|
|-

MTV Video Music Brazil
The MTV Video Music Brazil (VMB) was established by MTV Brasil in 1995. Lily Allen has received from two nominations.

|-
| align="center"|2007
| rowspan="2"|Lily Allen
| rowspan="2"|International Artist 
|
|-
| align="center"|2009
|
|-

mtvU Woodie Awards
mtvU, a division of MTV Networks owned by Viacom, broadcasts a 24-hour television channel available on more than 750 college and university campuses across the United States.[31] mtvU holds an annual awards show, the mtvU Woodie Awards, in which winners are determined by online voting.[32] Lily Allen has been nominated twice.

|-
| rowspan="2" align="center"|2007
| Lily Allen
| Woodie of the Year
| 
|-
| "Smile"
| Viral Woodie
| 
|-

Music Video Production Awards
The MVPA Awards are annually presented by a Los Angeles-based music trade organization to honor the year's best music videos.

|-
| 2007
| "Smile"
| Best Director of a New Artist 
|

Music Week Awards

|-
| align="center"|2007
| Lily Allen
| UK Marketing Campaign of the Year
| 
|-

NME Awards

NME Awards USA

|-
| align="center"|2008
| Lily Allen
| Best New International/Indie Alternative Solo Artist
| 
|-

Shockwaves NME Awards
The NME Awards are an annual music awards show founded by the music magazine NME. Lily Allen has won two awards from eight nominations.

|-
| rowspan="4" align="center"|2007
|rowspan="3"|Lily Allen
|Best Solo Artist
|
|-
|Sexiest Woman
|
|-
|Worst Dressed
|
|-
|Alright, Still
|Worst Album
|
|-
| align="center"|2008
| rowspan="4" | Lily Allen
|Best Band Blog
|
|-
| rowspan="1" align="center"|2010
|Giving It Back Fan Award
|
|-
| align="center"|2011
|Best Band Blog
|
|-
| rowspan="3" align="center"|2014
|Best Solo Artist
|
|-
|rowspan="2"|Hard Out Here
|Best Track
|
|-
|Best Video
|
|-
| 2018
| "Trigger Bang" (with Giggs)
| Best Collaboration 
|

NRJ Music Awards
The NRJ Music Awards, created in 2000 by the radio station NRJ in partnership with the television network TF1. Lily Allen has been nominated three times.

|-
| align="center"|2007
|rowspan="2"|Lily Allen
|International Revelation of the Year
|
|-
| rowspan="2" align="center"|2010
|International Female Artist of the Year
|
|-
|"Fuck You"
|International Song of the Year
|
|-

Popjustice £20 Music Prize

|-
| align="center"|2006
|"Smile"
|
|
|-
| align="center"|2009
|"The Fear"
|
|
|-

Premios Oye!
Premios Oye! are presented annually by the Academia Nacional de la Música en México for outstanding achievements in Mexican record industry. Lily Allen has won one award..

|-
| align="center"|2007
|Alright, Still
|English Breakthrough of the Year
|
|-

Q Awards
Q Awards were established in 1985 and the UK's annual music awards run by the music magazine Q. Lily Allen has received one award from three nominations.

|-
| align="center"|2006
|Lily Allen
|Best New Act
|
|-
| align="center"|2007
|"Alfie"
|Best Video
|
|-
| align="center"|2009
|"The Fear"
|Best Track
|
|-

Rober Awards Music Poll

|-
| 2009
| Lily Allen
| Guilty Pleasure
|

Teen Choice Awards
The Teen Choice Awards were established in 1999 to honor the year's biggest achievements in music, movies, sports and television, being voted by young people aged between 13 and 19. Lily Allen has been nominated once .

|-
| align="center"|2007
|Lily Allen
|Choice Music: Breakout Artist – Female
|
|-

The Sun's Bizarre Awards

|-
| align="center"|2006
|Lily Allen
|Best New Act
|
|-

The Record of the Year Awards

|-
| align="center"|2006
| rowspan="2"|Lily Allen
|Smile – 9th
|
|-
| align="center"|2009
|The Fear – 5th
|
|-

TMF Awards

|-
| align="center"|2006
|Lily Allen
|Best International New Artist
|
|-

UK Festival Awards

|-
| align="center"|2006
|Lily Allen
|Festival Pop Act
|
|-
| align="center"|2006
|Lily Allen
|Festival Breakthrough Act
|
|-
| align="center"|2007
|Lily Allen
|Festival Pop Act
|
|-
| align="center"|2009
|Lily Allen
|Festival Fitty of the Year – Girls
|
|-

UK Music Video Awards

|-
| align="center"|2008
| "Oh My God" (with Mark Ronson)
| Best Visual Effects in a Video
| 
|-
| align="center" rowspan=2|2009
| "The Fear
|Best Art Direction in a Video
|
|-
| "22"
|Best Telecine in a Video
|
|-
| align="center"|2010
| "Fuck You"
|Best Visual Effects in a Video
|
|-

Urban Music Awards UK
The Urban Music Awards is a British awards ceremony launched in 2003 to recognize the achievement of urban-based artists, producers, nightclubs, DJs, radio stations, and record labels.[39] Lily Allen has received one award from two nominations.

|-
| align="2"|2006
|Alright, Still
|Best Album
|
|-
| align="center"|2006
|Lily Allen
|Best Crossover Chart Act
|
|-

Virgin Media Music Awards
The Virgin Media Music Awards are the annual music awards. The winners are declared on their official site "Virgin Media". Lily Allen has received one awards from four nominations.

|-
| rowspan="4" align="center"|2009
|It's Not Me, It's You
|Best Album
|
|-
|"The Fear"
|Best Track
|
|-
|rowspan="2"|Lily Allen
|Hottest Female
|
|-
|Twit of the Year
|
|-

Vodafone Live Music Awards

|-
| rowspan="4" align="center"|2007
|Lily Allen
|Best Female Live
|
|-

World Music Awards

|-
| rowspan=7|2014
| rowspan=3|Herself
| World's Best Female Artist
| 
|-
| World's Best Live Act
|
|-
| World's Best Entertainer of the Year
| 
|-
| "True Love" (ft. Pink)
| rowspan=3|World's Best Song 
| 
|-
| "Somewhere Only We Know"
| 
|-
| rowspan=2|"Hard Out Here"
| 
|-
| World's Best Video
|

Žebřík Music Awards

!Ref.
|-
| 2006
| rowspan=2|Herself
| Best International Discovery 
| 
| rowspan=2|
|-
| 2009
| Best International Female
|

Theatre awards

WhatsOnStage Awards

|-
| 2022
| 2:22 A Ghost Story
| Best Actress in a Play
|

Other

Futurebook Awards

|-
| 2018
| My Thoughts Exactly
| Book of the Year
|

GQ Men of the Year Awards

|-
| align="center"|2009
| Lily Allen
| Woman of the Year
| 
|-

Highstreet Fashion Awards

|-
| align="center"|2008
| Lily Allen
| Best Dressed Celebrity
| 
|-

Morgan Awards

|-
| align="center"|2009
|Lily Allen
|Best Insult
|
|-

References

Lists of awards received by British musician
Awards